Geoff Smith (born 22 October 1948) is a former  Australian rules footballer who played with Hawthorn in the Victorian Football League (VFL).

References

External links 

Living people
1948 births
Australian rules footballers from South Australia
Hawthorn Football Club players
Norwood Football Club players